Richard Anthony (Tony) Thulborn is a British paleontologist. He is recognized as an expert in dinosaur tracks, and as one of the most productive paleontologists of his time.

In 1982, Thulborn debunked the purported plesiosaur embryos discovered by Harry Govier Seeley. Thulborn concluded that Seeley's supposed embryos were actually nodules of mudstone and shale derived from sediments that once filled in a crustacean burrow system and were not even animal body fossils.

References

British palaeontologists
Living people
Year of birth missing (living people)